Josephine Elisabeth Larissa Alhanko (born 24 April 1981) is a Swedish actress and former Miss Sweden title holder. She is a niece of the ballet dancer, Anneli Alhanko.

Alhanko was Sweden's 28th semi-finalist at the Miss Universe 2006 pageant, held on 23 July in Los Angeles. She was the first Miss Sweden to place in nine years. Alhanko won Miss Sweden title in 2006, with the judges describing her as "professional, humble and sympathetic."
At the Miss Universe pageant in 2006, Alhanko beat favorites including Erin McNaught of Australia. She has acted in various TV productions, movies and plays. She was also a student in the English National Ballet School (1997–98).  
She played Flash/Florence in the series Real Humans, which was broadcast on SVT and on Yle in Finland, and has since become an underground cult classic.

Filmography 
2002 – Dieselråttor och sjömansmöss
2002 – En av oss
2004 – Första intrycket
2005 – Världarnas bok
2012 – Irene Huss - Jagat vittne
2012 – Real Humans (Äkta människor): Flash/Florentine

References

External links

1981 births
Living people
Actresses from Stockholm
Swedish female models
Swedish people of Finnish descent
Miss Universe 2006 contestants
Swedish film actresses
Swedish stage actresses
Swedish television actresses
Miss Sweden winners
Swedish beauty pageant winners
21st-century Swedish actresses